Liu Junshuai (born 10 January 1995) is a Chinese footballer who currently plays for Qingdao Hainiu F.C., on loan from Shandong Luneng in the China League One.

Club career
Liu Junshuai went to Portugal for further training as a part of the Chinese Football Association's Project in 2011. He played for Fátima, Alverca and Real Massamá's youth academy between 2011 and 2014. He made his senior debut with Portuguese District Championships club Atlético Cacém in the 2014–15 season. Liu moved to Campeonato de Portugal side União Torreense in July 2015.

On 15 July 2016, Liu was loaned to Chinese Super League side Jiangsu Suning along with Yang Ailong. He played for Jiangsu Suning's reserve team in the 2016 season. Liu transferred to fellow Chinese Super League side Shandong Luneng on 5 February 2017. He made his debut for Shandong on 7 April 2017 in a 2–1 away defeat against Shanghai SIPG. On 25 July 2018, he scored his first goal for the club in a 3–0 home win over Guizhou Hengfeng in the quarter-finals of 2018 Chinese FA Cup. He would go on to establish himself as a regular within the team and would go on to be part of the squad that won the 2020 Chinese FA Cup.

On 29 April 2022, he transferred on loan to second tier club Qingdao Hainiu. He would go on to make his debut in a league game on 9 June 2022 against Shaanxi Chang'an Athletic in a 1-1 draw. He would go on to establish himself as regular within the team that gained promotion to the top tier at the end of the 2022 China League One campaign.

Career statistics 
Statistics accurate as of match played 25 December 2022.

Honours

Club
Shandong Luneng
Chinese Super League: 2021
Chinese FA Cup: 2020, 2021

References

External links
Player profile at soccerway.com

1995 births
Living people
Chinese footballers
Footballers from Qingdao
S.C.U. Torreense players
Shandong Taishan F.C. players
Segunda Divisão players
Chinese Super League players
Association football defenders
Chinese expatriate footballers
Expatriate footballers in Portugal
Chinese expatriate sportspeople in Portugal